Emanoil Răducanu (October 7, 1929 in Bucharest – 1991) was a Romanian basketball player who competed in the 1952 Summer Olympics.

He was part of the Romanian basketball team, which was eliminated in the first round of the 1952 tournament. He played both matches.

References

1929 births
1991 deaths
Basketball players from Bucharest
Basketball players at the 1952 Summer Olympics
Olympic basketball players of Romania
Romanian men's basketball players